Francis (Frank) Edward Weiss (born May 14, 1951) is a former career officer in the United States Army and collegiate basketball player.

Frank Weiss was born in Philadelphia, Pennsylvania to Berthold and Katherine Weiss (née Scullen). Weiss attended Holy Ghost Preparatory School from 1965 to 1969 and played on the varsity basketball team. He achieved a 30-point average with 20 rebounds a game while on the team and was inducted into the Holy Ghost Prep Hall of Fame in the 1980s.

In 1970, Weiss was accepted into the United States Military Academy at West Point, where he earned a place on the roster of the Army Black Knights men's basketball team under coach Bob Knight. While Knight was replaced by Dan Dougherty to start the 1971–72 school season, Weiss continued playing for the Black Knights throughout his collegiate career and lettered as a starter in 1973.

Upon graduating from West Point in 1973, he then served for 26 years in the United States Army, retiring as a colonel.

References

Army Black Knights men's basketball players
Living people
1951 births
Military personnel from Philadelphia
United States Military Academy alumni
United States Army officers